METALmorphosis is a large (7 metre, 13 tonne) kinetic sculpture of a human head, by Czech artist David Černý. The sculpture is in the Whitehall Corporate Center in Charlotte, North Carolina, where it was inaugurated in 2007, and it sits in a large reflecting pool.

The piece is executed in polished stainless steel.  The sculpture is made of 40 layers articulated into 7 pieces that can rotate individually.  Originally, the sculpture could spout water from the head's mouth. A later and larger work, Head of Franz Kafka, a bust of Franz Kafka made of 45 tonnes of steel, is in Prague.

References

External links
Metalmorphosis in Charlotte – A giant rotating head sculpture by David Černý
 

2007 sculptures
Kinetic sculptures in the United States
Sculptures in North Carolina
Stainless steel sculptures in the United States